The Ever After is a 2014 American drama film directed by Mark Webber and starring Teresa Palmer, Rosario Dawson, Melissa Leo and Webber.

Synopsis
Lovers struggle to overcome the everyday temptations of an ordinary human life; what they discover is somewhat extraordinary.

Cast
 Teresa Palmer as Ava
 Rosario Dawson as herself
 Phoebe Tonkin as Mabel
 Mark Webber as Thomas
 Melissa Leo
 Joshua Leonard as Christian
 Scott Mescudi as Scott
 Tom Bower as Father O'Meara	
 Tahyna Tozzi as Ms. Sanders
 Korrina Rico as Geraldine
 Luke Baines as himself
 Kiersten Hall as Sveltlana
 Gemma Pranita as Naja
 Brooke Stone as Brooke

Reception
Charlie Schmidlin of IndieWire gave the film a B−.

References

External links
 

American drama films
2014 films
2014 drama films
2010s English-language films
Films directed by Mark Webber
2010s American films